DCP Midstream Partners, LP (Enbridge and Phillips 66) is a Fortune 500 company for midstream petroleum services (i.e. transportation and refinery), headquartered in Denver, Colorado.

Background
As a publicly traded partnership, the company does not have directors, officers, or employees of its own, but relies on its general partner for managing its operations. As of 2015, it had a total economic value of more than $6 billion and 628 employees providing support, making it one of the largest midstream petroleum services company in the United States.

See also
 List of oilfield service companies

References

Chemical companies established in 2005
Companies based in Denver
2005 establishments in Colorado